Scopula inangulata is a moth of the  family Geometridae. It is found in India (the Khasi Hills).

References

Moths described in 1896
inangulata
Moths of Asia